50,000 B.C. is the sixth and final studio album by the American alternative rock band Shudder to Think, released in 1997. The album was a commercial disappointment.

Production
Kevin March, formerly of the Dambuilders, joined the band as its new drummer prior to the recording of 50,000 B.C. Singer Craig Wedren was battling Hodgkin's disease during the writing of the album; the band rewrote many of its songs to avoid producing an album that sounded too much like Pony Express Record. The album was produced by Ted Niceley.

Critical reception

The Washington Post thought that "Shudder hasn't sacrificed any of its cleverness, but it has added a little bit of soul, which is what makes this the band's most compelling album." Guitar Player wrote that "the band forgets about punk credibility and lets guitarist Nathan Larson fashion the kind of gleaming pop-metal hooks that his gutsy playing has always hinted at." 

Spin opined that "for fully half the tracks on this album, Wedren's voice could not unfairly be compared to that of Journey's Steve Perry." The Sunday Times declared that "'Beauty Strike' is the perfect Shudder to Think song, rushing at breakneck speed round unpredictable musical blind corners, an irresistible melody nailed to its back bumper, but the album is eventually marooned in a swamp of lumpy metallic riffing." The Independent wrote that the album "has real fibre, a depth and passion that's rare in guitar power rock." 

AllMusic called the album "the kind of eclectic post-punk that will primarily appeal to critics and record collectors."

Track listing
All songs written by Craig Wedren, except where noted.

References

Shudder to Think albums
1997 albums
Epic Records albums